The seventh season of NYPD Blue premiered on ABC on January 11, 2000, and concluded on May 23, 2000.

Episodes

References

NYPD Blue seasons
2000 American television seasons